Salinococcus is a genus of Gram-positive cocci belonging to the family Staphylococcaceae.

The genus name is derived from Latin salinus - saline, and Greek kokkos - a grain or berry). The genus was described in 1990 by Ventosa et al.

Description

The type strain is Salinicoccus roseus.

The genomic DNA G+C content of the species in this genus lies within the range of 46–51 mol%.

Genome

No species in this genus has had its genome sequenced to date.

Clinical

Species in this genus are not known to cause disease.

References

Staphylococcaceae
Bacteria genera